Dame Gwen Lucy Ffrangcon-Davies,  (25 January 1891 – 27 January 1992) was a British actress and centenarian.

Early life
She was born in London of a Welsh family; the name "Ffrangcon" is said to originate from a valley in Snowdonia. Her parents were opera baritone David Ffrangcon-Davies (né David Thomas Davies) and Annie Francis Rayner.

Career
Ffrangcon-Davies made her stage debut in 1911, as a singer as well as an actress, and received encouragement in her career from Ellen Terry. In 1924, she played Juliet opposite John Gielgud as Romeo, and Gielgud was grateful to her for the rest of his life for the kindness she showed him, casting her as Queen Anne in Richard of Bordeaux in 1934. In 1925, Ffrangcon-Davies played Tess in a stage version of Tess of the d'Urbervilles, including a special presentation for its author, Thomas Hardy.

In 1938, Ffrangcon-Davies appeared with Ivor Novello in a production of Henry V at Drury Lane. Later the same year, she appeared as Mrs. Manningham in the first production of Gaslight by Patrick Hamilton. Ffrangcon-Davies played Lady Macbeth for almost an entire year in 1942 opposite John Gielgud's Macbeth. She won the Evening Standard Award in 1958 for her performance as Mary Tyrone in Long Day's Journey Into Night.

Ffrangcon-Davies retired from the stage in 1970, but continued to appear on radio and television; in one such appearance, broadcast on Christmas Day, 1990, a month before her 99th birthday, she featured in the BBC radio show, With Great Pleasure, in which stars chose favourite readings, spoken by others, and by themselves. She chose "The Kingdom of God", by Francis Thompson, read by Alec McCowen; a passage from The Merchant of Venice, read by herself, and Anna Massey and Alec McCowen; "These I Have Loved", by Rupert Brooke, read by Anna Massey; and, a part of the Seven Pillars of Wisdom, by T. E. Lawrence, whom she once met, read by Alec McCowen; it was included in the 1992 compilation cassette With Great Pleasure. In the 1980s, well into her nineties, she appeared on the Wogan chat show, in which she recited, word for word, the famous death scene of Juliet.

She made her final acting appearance in a teleplay of the Sherlock Holmes mystery The Master Blackmailer at the age of 100. Her films included The Witches (1966) and The Devil Rides Out (1968), both for Hammer Films.

Personal life
She was created a Dame Commander of the Order of the British Empire in 1991, aged 100, and was the oldest-ever appointee to that honour until fellow actress Olivia de Havilland received her damehood in 2017. Ffrangcon-Davies died in 1992, two days after her 101st birthday. 

A lesbian, for many years her partner was South African actress Marda Vanne. She lived in the village of Stambourne, Essex.

She made two appearances on Desert Island Discs: one broadcast on 8 October 1962, and the other on 19 June 1988.

Filmography

References

Sources
 Martial Rose, Forever Juliet: the Life and Letters of Gwen Ffrangcon-Davies 1891–1992 (2003)
 Helen Grime Gwen Ffrangcon-Davies, Twentieth-Century Actress London: Routledge, 2015

External links
 

 

1891 births
1992 deaths
Actresses awarded damehoods
British centenarians
British film actresses
British stage actresses
Dames Commander of the Order of the British Empire
English people of Welsh descent
Actresses from London
Actors from Essex
People educated at South Hampstead High School
20th-century British actresses
British lesbian actresses
People from Braintree District
Women centenarians
20th-century English women
20th-century English people
20th-century English LGBT people